Vice-Admiral Eric William Longley-Cook,  (6 October 1898 – 20 April 1983) was a Royal Navy officer.

Naval career
Longley-Cook joined the Royal Navy as a cadet at the Royal Naval College, Dartmouth and was mobilised at the start of the First World War. He saw action in the battleship  in the British Adriatic Squadron.

He served in the Second World War as commanding officer of the cruiser  from July 1939, as deputy director of Training and Staff Duties from October 1940 and as deputy director of Gunnery and Anti-Aircraft Warfare from July 1941. He went on to be commanding officer of the cruiser  from April 1942, Captain of the Fleet for the Mediterranean Fleet in January 1943 and Captain of the Fleet for the East Indies Fleet in January 1945.

After the war he became Chief of Staff for the Home Fleet in November 1946 and Director of Naval Intelligence in May 1948. In that capacity he warned the British Government that the United States "was set to bomb Russia first" and that "all-out war against the Soviet Union was not only inevitable but imminent".

References

1898 births
1983 deaths
Royal Navy officers of World War I
Royal Navy officers of World War II
Royal Navy vice admirals
Directors of Naval Intelligence
Commanders of the Order of the British Empire
Companions of the Distinguished Service Order
Companions of the Order of the Bath
Recipients of the Legion of Honour